Fire and Ice may refer to:

Books and literature
 "Fire and Ice" (poem), a 1920 poem by Robert Frost
 Fire and Ice, part of a 1923 translated edition of The Long Journey by Johannes V. Jensen
 Fire and Ice (Hunter novel), a 2003 novel in the Warriors series by Erin Hunter
 Fire & Ice (manga), by Yasuda Tsuyoshi
 Fire and Ice, a 1976 biography of Revlon founder Charles Revson by Andrew Tobias
 Fire and Ice: The Korean War, 1950–1953, a 2000 book by Michael J. Varhola
 Fire (comics) and Ice (comics), a pair of DC Comics Justice League characters

Film 
 Fire and Ice (French: Le combat dans l'île), a 1962 French film with a screenplay by Jean-Paul Rappeneau
 Fire and Ice (1983 film), a 1983 animated feature film directed by Ralph Bakshi and co-created with Frank Frazetta
 Fire and Ice (1986 film), a 1986 freestyle skiing film directed by Willy Bogner
 Fire and Ice: The Winter War of Finland and Russia, a 2005 American documentary about the Winter War
 Fire and Ice: The Dragon Chronicles, a 2008 television film starring Amy Acker
 Dragons: Fire and Ice, a 2004 children's animated adventure movie
 Fire & Ice (2001 film), a television film starring Lark Voorhies
 The Snow Queen 3: Fire and Ice, a 2016 Russian animated film.

Games
 Fire and Ice (video game), a 1992 computer game originally produced for the Amiga
 Fire 'n Ice or Solomon's Key 2, a 1993 puzzle game for the Nintendo Entertainment System
 Sonic Boom: Fire & Ice, a 2016 action-adventure platform game for the Nintendo 3DS

Music
 Fire + Ice, an English neofolk ensemble

Albums 
 Fire & Ice (Cali Agents album), 2006
 Fire and Ice, a.k.a. On the Greek Side of My Mind, a 1971 Demis Roussos album
 Fire & Ice (Kaskade album), 2011
 Fire and Ice (Steve Camp album), 1983
 Fire & Ice (Yngwie Malmsteen album), 1992
 Fire & Ice, by Shirley Brown, 1989

Songs 
 Fire and Ice, a song by Bob Catley from The Tower
 Fire and Ice, a song by Cinderella from Long Cold Winter
 Fire and Ice, a song by Eloy from Destination
 "Fire and Ice" (Pat Benatar song), 1981
 Fire and Ice, a song by Running Wild from Blazon Stone
 "Fire and Ice" (Within Temptation song), 2011
 Fire and Ice, a song from the musical Grand Hotel

Sports
 Fire and Ice, a 1986 skating routine by British ice dancers Torvill and Dean
 Fire and Ice, a professional wrestling tag team composed of Scott Norton and Harold Hogue
 Fire and Ice, a nickname for Chris Corchiani and Rodney Monroe, basketball teammates at N.C. State from 1988 to 1991
 Borg–McEnroe rivalry, in professional tennis, the rivalry of John McEnroe and Björn Borg, nicknamed "Fire and Ice", also the title of 2011 HBO documentary about the pair

Television episodes 
 "Fire & Ice" (The Batman)
 "Fire and Ice" (Beverly Hills, 90210)
 "Fire and Ice" (Crossing Jordan)
 "Fire and Ice" (Daigunder)
 "Fire and Ice" (H2O: Just Add Water)
 "Fire and Ice" (MacGyver)
 "Fire & Ice" (Modern Marvels)
 "Fire and Ice" (Now and Again)
 "Fire and Ice" (Pokémon)
 "Fire and Ice" (A Shot at Love II with Tila Tequila)
 "Fire and Ice" (Storm Hawks)
 "Fire and Ice" (Winx Club)

Other uses
Solanum sisymbriifolium, sticky nightshade, also known as the fire-and-ice plant
Fire and Ice, a 1952 nail-polish shade and marketing campaign by Revlon
Dueling Dragons: Fire and Ice, another name for the roller coasters that became the Dragon Challenge for the Wizarding World of Harry Potter

See also
 Ice and Fire (disambiguation)